Wooroonooran is a locality split among the Cairns Region, the Cassowary Coast Region and the Tablelands Region in Queensland, Australia.

Geography

The locality is entirely within the Wooroonooran National Park (part of the Wet Tropics World Heritage Area), although the national park extends beyond the boundaries of the locality. As a consequence, the land is undeveloped apart from a very limited number of walking tracks and visitor amenities. The land is extremely mountainous containing numerous peaks, including Mount Bartle Frere (Queensland's highest peak), and numerous waterfalls, including the Josephine Falls and Fishery Falls.

The locality is very irregularly shaped and is approx 59 km from its northernmost point to its southernmost point and approx 38 km from its easternmost point to its westernmost point. Due to the vast size of this locality, it has numerous adjacent localities including (clockwise) Gordonvale (to the north), Aloomba, Fishery Falls, Bellenden Ker, Babinda, Mirriwinni (to the east), Bartle Frere, Woopen Creek, Ngatjan, Nerada, East Palmerston, Palmerston (to the south), Middlebrook, Mungalli, Ellinja, Millaa Millaa, Tarzali, Glen Allyn (to the west), Topaz, Butchers Creek, Gadgarra, and Goldsborough.

A prominent natural landmark is Walshs Pyramid, which rises steeply to 922m.

History 

In 2007 to 2008 the Mamu Rainforest Tropical Skywalk was constructed by the Queensland Parks and Wildlife Service. The work was contracted to Hutchinson Builders Pty Ltd.

Attractions

The Mamu Rainforest Tropical Skywalk is on the Palmerston Highway.

References

External links 
 

Cairns Region
Cassowary Coast Region
Tablelands Region
Localities in Queensland